The Gunlogson Farmstead Historic Site near Cavalier, North Dakota is a farm that was developed in 1882. It was listed on the National Register of Historic Places in 2008.

References

Farms on the National Register of Historic Places in North Dakota
1882 establishments in Dakota Territory
National Register of Historic Places in Pembina County, North Dakota